Luke Ford (born 26 March 1981) is a Canadian-Australian actor. His career began in television in 2000 and his first film role was in 2006 before being cast in The Mummy: Tomb of the Dragon Emperor in 2008. Ford's regular television roles include those in the Australian series Underbelly in 2013, Cleverman in 2017, and Amazing Grace in 2021.

Early life
Ford was born on 26 March 1981 in Vancouver, British Columbia, Canada but raised in Sydney, Australia. He attended Parramatta Marist High School in Westmead, Sydney, and once worked at the Winston Hills Hotel, and a short stint at Universal Magazines in North Ryde. Ford studied acting at The Actor's Pulse in Sydney, becoming one of the school's earliest graduates. He later returned to teach the Meisner technique when he was between film roles.

Film career
Ford began acting professionally with a string of performances on Australian television, starting with a guest-starring role on Water Rats, followed by roles on McLeod's Daughters, Home and Away, Stingers, Breakers and All Saints. He appeared in the TV movie Junction Boys alongside Tom Berenger, as Iphicles in the NBC miniseries Hercules, and in the short-lived Australian series Headland.

Ford was short listed for a 'Best New Talent' Logie Award for his recurring role of Craig Woodland on McLeod's Daughters.

Ford's film career began with the release of the Australian film Kokoda in 2006, delivering a performance as Burke, a slain soldier on the Kokoda Trail.

Next came The Black Balloon with Toni Collette, a performance that won him an Australian Film Institute Award for Best Supporting Actor in 2008. In the film, Ford plays Charlie Mollison, a boy with autism and ADD. Ford spent six months researching the role, including taking to the streets of Sydney in character to determine the effectiveness of his characterisation. The Black Balloon premiered at the Berlin Film Festival, where it won the Crystal Bear award.

Immediately following The Black Balloon, Ford signed on to star in the third instalment of the Mummy series, The Mummy: Tomb of the Dragon Emperor opposite Brendan Fraser and Maria Bello. In the film, Ford plays Alex O'Connell, son of Fraser's Rick O'Connell and Bello's Evelyn O'Connell. The film was released in the US on 1 August 2008 and grossed $403 million worldwide.

In 2009, he had roles in 3 Acts of Murder and Ghost Machine.

In 2010 and 2011, he had roles in several Australian films, including Animal Kingdom, Red Dog and Face to Face.

Filmography

Films

Television

Video games

References

External links

Interview – Web Wombat Movie Channel

1981 births
Male actors from Vancouver
Australian male film actors
Australian people of Canadian descent
Canadian male film actors
Canadian male television actors
Canadian male voice actors
Living people
21st-century Canadian male actors
21st-century Australian male actors
Male actors from Sydney
Best Supporting Actor AACTA Award winners